Cholesteryl oleyl carbonate (COC) is an organic chemical, a carbonate ester of cholesterol and oleyl alcohol with carbonic acid. It is a liquid crystal material forming cholesteric liquid crystals with helical structure. It is a transparent liquid, or a soft crystalline material with melting point around 20 °C. It can be used with cholesteryl nonanoate and cholesteryl benzoate in some thermochromic liquid crystals.

It is used in some hair colors, make-ups, and some other cosmetic preparations.

It can be also used as a component of the liquid crystals used for liquid crystal displays.

References

Cholestanes
Liquid crystals
Carbonate esters